Andrew Willis Stovold (born 19 March 1953, Southmead, Bristol, England) is a retired English cricketer. He was a right-handed batsman and wicketkeeper who represented Gloucestershire (1973–1990), Marylebone Cricket Club (1976) and Orange Free State (1974/75–1975/76). 

Stovold was man of the match in the final when Gloucestershire won the 1977 Benson & Hedges Cup, and also played when the county won the 1973 Gillette Cup.

References

External links
CricketArchive
ESPN Cricinfo

1953 births
Living people
Cricketers from Bristol
English cricketers
Free State cricketers
Gloucestershire cricketers
Marylebone Cricket Club cricketers
English cricket coaches